Mikhail Youzhny was the defending champion but chose not to participate.

Janko Tipsarević won the title after defeating Li Zhe 6–2, 6–3 in the final.

Seeds

Draw

Finals

Top half

Bottom half

References
 Main Draw
 Qualifying Draw

Singles
Bangkok Challenger II - Singles
 in Thai tennis